The cistern of lateral cerebral fossa is a subarachnoid cistern formed in front of each temporal lobe by the arachnoid mater bridging across the lateral sulcus.

This cistern contains the middle cerebral artery.

References 

Meninges